Sam Wood is an archaeologist TV Presenter who presented the BBC documentary 'On Hannibal's Trail'.

Works 

Sam Wood presented his first documentary for the BBC in 2010. On Hannibal's Trail is a history and travel BBC television series in which three Australian brothers - Danny, Ben and Sam Wood - set out cycling on the trail of Hannibal, the Carthaginian general who marched from Spain to Rome at the head of an invading army accompanied by elephants.

The series was first shown on BBC Four in July 2010, and later repeated on BBC HD and BBC Two. In 2012 it was sold to the National Geographic Channel and ViaSat is now being shown worldwide.

References 

 BBC On Hannibal's Trail Website http://www.bbc.co.uk/programmes/b00t6skb
 Woodbrothers Expeditions Website http://www.woodbrothers.tvhttp://www.bbc.co.uk/programmes/b00t6skb
 Wood, Sam “On the trail of Hannibal” RideOn(Jan., 2012). http://rideons.wordpress.com/2012/01/13/on-the-trail-of-hannibal/
 Wood, Sam.. "On Hannibal's Trail"  World Archaeology(September 2010). http://www.world-archaeology.com/travel/on-hannibals-trail/

External links 
Sam Wood :: BBC On Hannibal's Trail
Sam Wood :: National Geographic On Hannibal's Trail
Bike Odyssey Cycling Tours Hannibal Expedition, hosted by Sam Wood

British archaeologists
Living people
BBC people
Year of birth missing (living people)